The Avon Viaduct carries the railway over the River Avon at Linlithgow, West Lothian, Scotland.

The 442-yard, 23-arch bridge was built in 1839–1841 by John Miller, engineer for the Edinburgh and Glasgow Railway.

The viaduct straddles the border between the West Lothian and Falkirk Council areas, so has two Historic Environment Scotland listings. The viaduct is a category A listed building.

To distinguish it from the older viaduct it is usually referred to by the alternative name of Westfield Viaduct.

The Avonbank Viaduct was opened by the Slamannan and Borrowstounness Railway in 1847 and now carries the Bo'ness and Kinneil Railway over the river.

See also
List of Category A listed buildings in Falkirk
 List of listed buildings in Muiravonside, Falkirk 
 List of railway bridges and viaducts in the United Kingdom

References

External links

Bridges in Falkirk (council area)
Bridges completed in 1841
Railway bridges in Scotland
Category A listed buildings in Falkirk (council area)
Listed bridges in Scotland
Category A listed buildings in West Lothian
1841 establishments in Scotland
Viaducts in Scotland